The women's 4 × 200 metre freestyle relay event at the 2022 Commonwealth Games was held on 31 July at the Sandwell Aquatics Centre.

Records
Prior to this competition, the existing world, Commonwealth and Games records were as follows:

The following records were established during the competition:

Schedule
The schedule is as follows:

All times are British Summer Time (UTC+1)

Results

Final

References

Women's 4 x 200 metre freestyle relay
Commonwealth Games